Bartonella queenslandensis is a Gram-negative bacteria from the genus Bartonella which was isolated from the blood of rats from the genus of Melomys in Queensland in Australia.

References

External links
Type strain of Bartonella queenslandensis at BacDive -  the Bacterial Diversity Metadatabase

Bartonellaceae
Bacteria described in 2009